The Samuel Gunn House is a historic house in Snow Hill, Worcester County, Maryland. Built around 1780, it is one of the oldest and best preserved of the 18th century Georgian town dwellings in Worcester County. It is a two-story, side hall / double pile frame house. It was listed on the National Register of Historic Places in 2002.

References

External links
, including photo from 2002, at Maryland Historical Trust

Houses completed in 1780
Houses on the National Register of Historic Places in Maryland
Houses in Worcester County, Maryland
Georgian architecture in Maryland
National Register of Historic Places in Worcester County, Maryland